Azhagi may refer to:

 Azhagi (1953 film), a 1953 film directed by Sundar Rao Nadkarni
 Azhagi (2002 film), a 2002 romantic drama films directed by Thangar Bachchan
 Azhagi (TV series), a soap opera
 Azhagi (software)